Bondia may refer to:

 Bondia (genus), a genus of moth
 Bondia (newspaper), a newspaper in Andorra and in Lleida, Spain
 767 Bondia, a minor planet of the Sun
 Bondia, an album by Catalan group Els Pets